Stian Lind Halvorsen (born 3 March 1975) is a retired Norwegian football defender. His latest club was Bærum SK, and he has most notably played professionally with Strømsgodset IF, including 19 matches in the Norwegian Premier League in 2001.

References
100% Fotball  

1975 births
Living people
Norwegian footballers
Bærum SK players
Strømsgodset Toppfotball players
Eliteserien players
Association football defenders